Education in the U.S. city of San Antonio, Texas hosts over 100,000 students across its 31 higher-education facilities which include the University of Texas at San Antonio, Texas A&M University-San Antonio, and the Alamo Community College District's five colleges. Other schools include St. Mary's University, the University of the Incarnate Word, Trinity University, and Wayland Baptist University. The San Antonio Public Library serves all of these institutions along with the 17 school districts within San Antonio.

The city is also home to more than 30 private schools and charter schools. These schools include San Antonio Academy, Holy Cross High School, Incarnate Word High School, St. Anthony Catholic High School.

Colleges, universities, and research institutes 

 Alamo Community College District
 Northeast Lakeview College
 Northwest Vista College
 Palo Alto College
 San Antonio College
 St. Philip's College
 Baptist University of the Américas
 Cancer Therapy & Research Center
 Concordia University Texas - San Antonio
 Culinary Institute of America - San Antonio
 Everest Institute
 Hallmark University
 Mind Science Foundation
 Oblate School of Theology
 Our Lady of the Lake University
 Southwest Foundation for Biomedical Research
 Southwest Research Institute
 St. Mary's University
 St. Mary's University School of Law
 Texas A&M University–San Antonio
 Trinity University
 University of Texas at San Antonio
 University of Texas Health Science Center at San Antonio
 University of Phoenix - San Antonio
 University of the Incarnate Word
 Wayland Baptist University
 Webster University

Public schools and libraries 
The city of San Antonio is also served by the following independent school districts (ISDs):

 Alamo Heights
 East Central
 Edgewood
 Fort Sam Houston
 Harlandale
 Judson
 North East
 Northside
 San Antonio
 South San Antonio
 Southside
 Southwest
 Somerset

The city is served by the San Antonio Public Library.

Charter schools 
 Anne Frank Inspire Academy
 BASIS San Antonio Primary Medical Center
 BASIS San Antonio Primary North Central
 BASIS San Antonio Shavano
 Brooks Academy of Science and Engineering
 Brooks Collegiate Academy
 Brooks Lone Star Academy
 Brooks Oaks Academy
 Compass Rose Academy
 Foundation School for Autism
 Founders Classical Academy of Schertz
 Great Hearts Monte Vista
 Great Hearts Northern Oaks
 Great Hearts Western Hills
 Harmony Science Academy San Antonio
 Jubilee Academies
 KIPP San Antonio Public Schools
 KIPP Aspire
 KIPP Camino
 KIPP Esperanza Dual Language Academy
 KIPP Poder
 KIPP Un Mundo Dual Language Academy
 KIPP University Prep
 Eleanor Kolitz Hebrew Language Academy (EKHLA) - It was the first Hebrew language-based charter school in the state. In the 2017-2018 school year, it had 320 students. It previously was located in the San Antonio Jewish Community Harry and Jeanette Weinberg Campus, but in 2019 moved to a new facility as the former one became occupied by the private San Antonio International Academy. The school began having three classes in the Kindergarten and first grade levels and will expand each subsequent grade level per year, and it expects its new campus to eventually house 650 students. In 2019 the school leadership stated that it does not wish to have high school grades even though the school's charter permits this.
 School of Science and Technology - Alamo
 School of Science and Technology - Discovery
 School of Science and Technology - Northwest
 School of Science and Technology - San Antonio
 Southwest Preparatory School Northeast
 Southwest Preparatory School Northwest
 Southwest Preparatory School Southeast
 Closed
 Academy of Careers and Technologies - In 2014 the school was to automatically lose its charter under Texas Education Agency (TEA) rules.
 Alameda School for Art & Design - In 2014 the school was to automatically lose its charter under TEA rules.
 City Center Health Careers - In 2014 the school was to automatically lose its charter under TEA rules.
 Henry Ford Academy (senior high school) - In 2014 it had 165 students and it had passed academic accountability markers in 2013-2014. Jessica Sanchez was the superintendent at that point. The TEA announced in 2014 that it the school was to automatically lose its charter because it failed financial accountability measures for the third time.
 Higgs Carter King Gifted & Talented Charter Academy - In 2014 the school was to automatically lose its charter under TEA rules.
 San Antonio Preparatory Academy - In 2014 the school was to automatically lose its charter under TEA rules.

By 2012 philanthropic organizations made efforts to expand the use of charter schools in the city, and these efforts continued into 2015. In 2018 the city government allowed IDEA Public Schools to issue tax-exempt bonds, which are less expensive than the kinds of bonds it could previously issue. San Antonio-area public school districts protested the move, stated that this would cause charter schools to cannibalize them. In 2019 IDEA announced plans to expand in the San Antonio area after the United States Department of Education issued it a $116 million grant.

Private schools 
San Antonio has many private schools, including:

 Central Catholic Marianist High School
 Antonian College Preparatory High School
 The Atonement Catholic Academy
 Carver Academy
 Castle Hills First Baptist School
 Christian Academy of San Antonio (CASA)
 The Circle School
 The Clowvazar Academy
 Cornerstone Christian School
 Concordia Lutheran School
 Destiny Christian Schools
 Gateway Christian School
 Harvest Academy
 Holy Cross High School
 Holy Spirit Catholic School
 Incarnate Word High School
 Keystone School
 Eleanor Kolitz Academy
 Lutheran High School of San Antonio
 New Life Christian Academy
 Providence High School
 Rainbow Hills Baptist School
 River City Christian School
 Rolling Hills Catholic School
 Saint Mary's Hall
 Saint Pius X Catholic School
 San Antonio Academy
 San Antonio Christian School
 San Antonio Country Day Montessori School
 Sendero Christian Academy
 St. Anthony Catholic High School
 St. John Bosco School
 St. Matthew Catholic School
 St. Mary's Hall
 St. Monica Catholic School
 St. Paul Catholic School
 St. Gerard Catholic High School
 St. Luke Catholic School
 The Montessori School of San Antonio
 T.M.I.: The Episcopal School of Texas
 Trinity Christian School
 The Winston School of San Antonio
 Village Parkway Christian School
 St. Lukes Episcopal School
 South Texas Vocational Technical Institute
 St. Thomas More Catholic School

Miscellaneous education
The Japanese Supplementary School of San Antonio (JSSSA; サンアントニオ日本語補習校 San Antonio Nihongo Hoshūkō), a Japanese weekend supplementary school holding classes for Japanese Americans and Japanese nationals, holds its classes at Raba Elementary School in San Antonio.

References 

 
Education facilities in San Antonio
Education facilities
San Antonio